Following is a list of senators of Saint Barthélemy, people who have represented the department of Saint Barthélemy in the Senate of France.
The department was created in 2008.

Election
The lone senator from Saint Barthélemy, like all national senators, is elected for a six-year term. The senator is selected through an indirect election by the twenty-one "great electors" of Saint Barthélemy. The electors are composed of all nineteen members of the Territorial Council of Saint Barthélemy, the incumbent Senator for Saint Barthélemy, and the national deputy of the French National Assembly for Saint Barthélemy and Saint-Martin's 1st constituency.

Fifth Republic 
Senators for Saint-Barthélemy under the French Fifth Republic were:

References

Sources

 
Lists of members of the Senate (France) by department